DSHS may refer to:

High schools
Daejeon Science High School in South Korea
Daegu Science High School in South Korea 
Davis Senior High School in California
Dover-Sherborn High School in Massachusetts
Dublin Scioto High School in Ohio
Duncraig Senior High School in Western Australia

Other
Devil Sold His Soul, a British metalcore band
State of Slovenes, Croats and Serbs
Texas Department of State Health Services
Washington Department of Social and Health Services